{{DISPLAYTITLE:C13H20 }}
The molecular formula C13H20 (molar mass: 176.303 g/mol) may refer to:

 Tetracyclopropylmethane, a polycyclic hydrocarbon
 A lot of Alkylbenzenes, derivatives of benzene

Molecular formulas